Hannah Berney, known as Violet Skies, is a singer-songwriter from Chepstow in Monmouthshire, Wales.

Musical career
In 2013, Violet Skies released her first song, "How the Mighty". WalesOnline called it "a pulsing, classically arranged electro slow-burner of a song that merges Massive Attack with a haunting piano and the singer's equally stark and soulful vocals", and it included the song on its list of the 51 greatest Welsh pop records of 2013.

In June 2014 she released her debut solo EP, Dragons, and played at the Glastonbury Festival on the BBC Introducing Stage. That same summer, she played a headline London show and later opened for A Great Big World at Bush Hall in Shepherd's Bush. In January 2015 she released a new song, "Liar".

Violet also released an album and EP with Bristol-based producer Stumbleine through Monotreme Records in early 2014. In June 2019, Skies released the EP I'll Buy a House, which contains four of her singles. A few months later, she released the acoustic version of her EP.

She has also co-written the song "God Is a Dancer" for the British singer Mabel and the Dutch DJ Tiësto. "God Is a Dancer" spent eight weeks in the United Kingdom Top 40, peaking at number 15.

On 3 April 2020 Skies released an EP, Lonely, containing five songs: "Lonely", "Nothing at Night", "Half My Life", "Born On Valentine's Day" and "This Could Be Love".

Personal life
Born Hannah Berney in Chepstow in Monmouthshire, Wales, she was a student at Wyedean School in Sedbury, where she wrote songs with friends during lunch breaks. After graduating, Violet attended Exeter University, where she studied French and history. While at Exeter, she was a contestant on The Voice UK in 2012.

She and Charlie McClean founded sheWrites, a series of woman-only camps for songwriters, producers, and artists, that convene in different places around the world, in order to encourage women to make connections, make songs, and make an impact in the music industry.

When asked about her musical pseudonym, Violet Skies, she said her great-grandmother's name was Violet, and Skies was her mother's idea.

Discography
 Dragons (EP) (2014)
 Chasing Honeybees (EP) (Monotreme Records, 2014) (as Stumbleine featuring Violet Skies)
 I'll Buy a House (EP) (2019)
 I'll Buy a House (Acoustic) (EP) (2019)
 Lonely (EP) (2020)

References

External links
 

Living people
People from Chepstow
Alumni of the University of Exeter
21st-century Welsh women singers
Welsh pop singers
Year of birth missing (living people)